Philip Newton Baker DM, FRCOG, FMedSci, is a British obstetrician, currently head of the College of Medicine, Biological Sciences and Psychology at the University of Leicester. He gained academic degrees from the universities of Nottingham, Cambridge, and Pittsburgh and then held top academic positions at the University of Nottingham and the University of Manchester. Baker has over 450 scientific publications primarily in the field of pre-eclampsia and other obstetric topics.

He is a fellow of the Academy of Medical Sciences and of the Royal College of Obstetricians and Gynaecologists.

Among his numerous textbooks is Obstetrics and Gynaecology: An evidence-based text for MRCOG, published by Taylor & Francis.

In October 2000, Baker was criticised by a judge for ignoring the anxieties of a woman whose baby was subsequently stillborn.  The woman won damages for the death of her baby, after Baker refused her request for a caesarean section.

He later went on to become the dean of medicine and dentistry at the University of Alberta. He resigned in 2011 after students reported him for delivering a plagiarized speech a convocation banquet. The speech was reportedly lifted from an American doctor, Atul Gawande, who originally wrote and delivered the speech for the Stanford medical graduation in 2010.

Subsequently, Baker moved to New Zealand, taking a leading role at the National Centre of Growth and Development (Gravida) in Auckland.

References

External links
Professor Philip Newton Baker; University of Auckland

Living people
People from Auckland
New Zealand obstetricians
British obstetricians
Alumni of the University of Nottingham
Alumni of the University of Cambridge
University of Pittsburgh alumni
Academics of the University of Nottingham
Academics of the University of Manchester
Academics of the University of Leicester
Academic staff of the University of Alberta
Fellows of the Royal College of Obstetricians and Gynaecologists
Fellows of the Academy of Medical Sciences (United Kingdom)
Date of birth missing (living people)
People involved in plagiarism controversies
20th-century British medical doctors
21st-century New Zealand medical doctors
Year of birth missing (living people)